Hill is an electoral district of the Legislative Assembly in the Australian state of Queensland. It was created in the 2017 redistribution, and first contested at the Queensland state election the same year. It was named after geologist Dorothy Hill.

It is a new seat centered on the Atherton Tableland region, encompassing the coastal region around Innisfail, Tully and Babinda. It was created largely out of the northern portion of the abolished seat of Dalrymple.

From results of the 2015 election, Hill was estimated to be a marginal seat for Katter's Australian Party with a margin of 4.9%. Shane Knuth, the last member for Dalrymple, transferred to Hill and retained it for KAP on a large swing.

Members for Hill

Election results

See also
 Electoral districts of Queensland
 Members of the Queensland Legislative Assembly by year
 :Category:Members of the Queensland Legislative Assembly by name

References

Electoral districts of Queensland